MCN or Motor Cycle News is a UK weekly motorcycling newspaper published by Bauer Consumer Media, based in Peterborough, United Kingdom. It claims to be "the world’s biggest weekly motorcycle newspaper".

The title was founded in late 1955 as Motorcycle News by Cyril Quantrill, a former employee of Motor Cycling, and was sold to EMAP in 1956. Bauer bought Emap's consumer media division in 2008.

The brand has expanded to include the MCN website, MCN Mobile, iPhone app, the 'MCN Compare' Insurance Comparison service, MCN London and Scottish Motorcycle Show and the MCN Live! at Skegness party weekend.

In 2009, average weekly circulation was 114,304 copies according to the Audit Bureau of Circulations,
and 2010 it was 106,446 copies.

The figure for 2018 was 56,839.

Early years

Cyril Quantrill was an employee of Motor Cycling under famous editor Graham Walker, learning his trade both pre and post-war. The British motorcycle media was traditionally dominated by two rival publishing houses - Temple Press with Motor Cycling and Iliffe with The Motor Cycle. Both were weekly magazine-format Thursday publications.

Using his growing skill-set, Quantrill recognised an opening for a Wednesday newspaper-format venture which could better-showcase sport — an area largely not covered by his employer Motor Cycling or The Motor Cycle

With his friend Peter Baldwin — whose father owned a print-works at Tunbridge Wells — Quantrill established his own publication Motorcycle News from a small office off Fleet Street and, in conjunction with Baldwin Press, produced the first issue dated 30 November 1955.

Limited by a 3,000 issue print-run capability and underfunding, Quantrill arranged to sell to EMAP in 1956. Under new ownership the issues were still priced at fourpence, but the title had changed to non-italic upper case MOTORCYCLE NEWS.

Quantrill stayed on as editor and with EMAP's backing the brand flourished. By the time of Quantrill's resignation in 1961 circulation was at 67,000.

Quantrill continued working as a journalist, including as editor of Motor Cyclist Illustrated, published by City Magazines Ltd of London. Continuing  Quantrill's earlier motivation of sports reporting, it had the strapline "the sporting monthly".

Middle years

Motorcycle News as a sporting newspaper was pitched to beat the rivals to the newsstands by one day. Both of the rivals were still magazine-format and remained traditionally producing practical and informative general coverage.

By 1962, the front page had been restyled by replacing the centred-title with a left-corner masthead box. Changing the Title text to three stacked short words with larger initial letters released more space for headlines and larger images whilst creating the MOTOR CYCLE NEWS  which in the public mind became the common name and gave rise to the acronym 'MCN'.

In March 1966 MCN produced a colour ten-year anniversary supplement with various contributors including sporting notables Mike Hailwood, Bill Ivy, Jeff Smith, Dave Bickers, Alf Hagon and Charlie Rous summarising the developments and highlights of the past ten years' reporting, together with representatives of the major bike manufacturers  stating their aspirations for future trading.

In 1962, rival Motor Cycling had gone to newspaper format having more sporting coverage and with larger pages allowing for large action images. Another rival publication Motor Cycle (as it was by then known, having dropped 'The' from its title in 1962) continued as a magazine until August 1967 when it joined with elements of Motor Cycling to produce a newspaper format on Wednesdays as Motor Cycle Incorporating Motor Cycling.

Later years

The two publications continued as rival 'papers. From the late 1960s, the MCN corner-masthead became blue, turning to the familiar red for the 1970s, gradually introducing more colour into the pages. Rival 'Motor Cycle' became Motor Cycle Weekly, which reverted to a glossy-magazine format in 1983 in an effort to boost sales figures by then-publisher IPC before eventual closure in late 1983. MCN continued from strength to strength.

MCN awards
MCN have been presenting an annual awards ceremony almost since they were founded in 1955. These included the popularity poll 'Man of the Year' and the overall 'MCN Machine of the Year' award:

References

External links
 

1955 establishments in the United Kingdom
Bauer Group (UK)
Motorcycle magazines published in the United Kingdom
Weekly magazines published in the United Kingdom
Magazines established in 1955